The sharpfin houndshark (Triakis acutipinna) is a houndshark of the family Triakidae. Only two specimens have been found, both in the coastal waters of Ecuador, the longest one being 1.02 m in length. The reproduction of this houndshark is ovoviviparous.

References

sharpfin houndshark
Ovoviviparous fish
Fish of Ecuador
sharpfin houndshark